Centromere protein T is a protein that in humans is encoded by the CENPT gene.

Clinical significance 
Mutations in CENPT cause an autosomal recessive syndrome of microcephaly, short stature, skeletal abnormalities, underdeveloped genitalia and pubertal delay.

See also 

 CENPE
 CENPF
 CENPJ

References

External links

Further reading